Sergei Ivanovich Ilyin (born 5 August 1968) is a former Russian football player.

External links
 

1968 births
Living people
Soviet footballers
FC Zenit Saint Petersburg players
Russian footballers
Russian Premier League players
FC KAMAZ Naberezhnye Chelny players
FC Tekstilshchik Kamyshin players
Association football defenders
FC Torpedo Vladimir players